This is a list of episodes from The second season of Barney Miller.

Broadcast history
The season originally aired Thursdays at 8:00-8:30 pm (EST) and 8:30-9:00 pm (EST).

Episodes

References

1975 American television seasons
1976 American television seasons
Barney Miller seasons